Nanba (written: 難波, 南波,南場 or 南羽), sometimes romanized as Namba, is a Japanese surname. Notable people with the surname include:

, Japanese swimmer
, Japanese pornographic actress
, Japanese student attempted murder
, Japanese rugby player
, Japanese football player
, Japanese musician
, Japanese director
, Japanese composer
, Japanese voice actor
, Japanese swimmer
, Japanese artist
, Japanese actor
, Japanese rower
Simamkele Namba (born 1998), South African rugby player
, Japanese table tennis player
, Japanese entrepreneur
, Japanese mountaineer

See also
 Namba Roy (1910–1961), Jamaican novelist and artist

Japanese-language surnames